Atul Kumar Anjaan is a senior CPI leader and national secretary of the Communist Party of India. He is the General Secretary of the All India Kisan Sabha.

He did his schooling from Lucknow in state board school and graduation, post graduation and then L.L.B also from Lucknow University in 1967, 1972, 1976 and 1983 respectively. As of 1978, Anjan was the Uttar Pradesh State President of the All India Students Federation.

Ghosi (Lok Sabha constituency) has the history of sending Communist Party of India (CPI) candidates for many times and remained a stronghold of communists in northern India till early 1980s but 1990s onwards communist lost its ground from there but still CPI fielded Atul Kumar as a CPI candidate from Ghosi in the general election, 2014 and he fought unsuccessfully Lok Sabha election since 1998 from Ghosi.

See also
 Kalpnath Rai
 Mokhtar Ansari
 Jharkhande Rai

References

University of Lucknow alumni
Politicians from Lucknow
Communist Party of India politicians from Uttar Pradesh
Candidates in the 2014 Indian general election
20th-century Indian politicians
21st-century Indian politicians
Living people
Communist Party of India candidates in the 2014 Indian general election
Leaders of 2020–2021 Indian farmers' protest
1950s births
Year of birth missing (living people)